Cattal is a railway station on the Harrogate Line, which runs between  and  via . It is owned by Network Rail and managed by Northern Trains.

Cattal is at the western end of a dual track section from Hammerton. Trains heading east towards York are timetabled to arrive first on the dual track section, in order to clear the single-track line heading west towards Harrogate. The level crossing here still has manually-operated metal gates and a ground-level signal box. The station buildings are now privately owned.

Facilities
The station has a modest car park of 22 spaces and has a section of bike stands. Apart from the crossing keeper, the station is unstaffed and all tickets must be purchased on the train. Step-free access is available to both platforms, with digital information screens and a long-line P.A system for train running information provision.

Services

As of the May 2021 timetable change, the station is served by an hourly service to Leeds and York, with additional services running at peak times. All services are operated by Northern Trains.

Rolling stock used: Class 158 Express Sprinter and Class 170 Turbostar

References

External links
 
 

Railway stations in North Yorkshire
DfT Category F2 stations
Railway stations in Great Britain opened in 1848
Northern franchise railway stations
Former York and North Midland Railway stations